Khaki-ye Olya may refer to:

 Khaki-ye Olya, Kerman
 Khaki-ye Olya, Lorestan